Nevada, a state in the western region of the United States of America, hosts a large number of Native Americans who have traditionally lived in the Great Basin, a large geographic feature of Nevada. There are four Native American languages that are spoken by recognized tribes of Nevada, three of which fall under the Uto-Aztecan languages classification while the other is an isolate. A minority language is also spoken in Nevada.

Distribution
There are four Native American languages currently spoken in Nevada. Population estimates are based on figures from Ethnologue and U.S. Census data, as given in sub-pages below. The four languages are shown in the table below:

Minority languages 
Mojave language is spoken on the Fort Mojave Indian Reservation, which is split between Arizona, California, and Nevada, in order of decreasing land area present in each respective state. Mojave is a Yuman language.

See also
 Native Americans in the United States
 Indigenous peoples of the Great Basin
 Indigenous languages of the Americas
 Uto-Aztecan languages
 Washo language

References

Indigenous languages of the Southwestern United States
Indigenous languages of the North American Great Basin
 
Native American history of Nevada